MMR may refer to:

Science and technology
 MMR vaccine, for measles, mumps and rubella
 DNA mismatch repair, a genetic repair pathway
 Mass miniature radiography, a tuberculosis screening technique
 Maternal mortality ratio, the ratio of the number of maternal deaths during a given time period per 100,000 live births during the same time-period
 Maternal mortality rate, the number of maternal deaths in a population divided by the number of women of reproductive age
 Mean-motion resonance, an interaction between two orbiting bodies
 Mesozoic Marine Revolution, the burst of evolution in the Mesozoic era caused by increased predation pressure

Computing
 Meet-me room, a place where networks providers offer interconnectivity to their backbones
 Modified Modified READ, an image compression algorithm
 Multi-master replication, a method of database replication
 Matchmaking rating, a value score given for matchmaking in games

Arts and entertainment
 Metal Mind Records, a Polish record label
 MetroMedia Radio, a former American radio network
 Mercury Meltdown Remix and Mercury Meltdown Revolution, ports of the 2006 puzzle video game Mercury Meltdown

Places
 Myanmar (ISO 3166-1 alpha-3 country code)
 Mumbai Metropolitan Region, India

Other uses
 Merchant Marine Reserve, members of the US Merchant Marine who are also members of the US Navy
 Marine Mammal Regulations, of Canada
 Master of Marketing Research, a business degree

See also
 WMMR, a rock radio station in Philadelphia, US
 KMMR, a full-service radio station in Malta, Montana, US